Couroupita is a genus of flowering plants in the family Lecythidaceae first described as a genus in 1775. It is native to tropical South America and Central America.

Species
 Couroupita nicaraguarensis – Bala de cañón, coco de mono, paraíso, zapote de mico, or zapote de mono -Nicaragua, Costa Rica, Honduras, Panama
 Couroupita subsessilis - northern Brazil, northern Peru

References

External links
 
 Couroupita on The Lecythidaceae Pages

Lecythidaceae
Neotropical realm flora
Ericales genera